Guia Soncini (born October 19, 1972) is an Italian columnist and writer. She writes amongst others for La Repubblica and Gioia!.

Writing 
Soncini is a prolific writer of both fiction and non-fiction books. After publishing Elementi di capitalismo amoroso in 2008 through Rizzoli, she chose to self-publish her book Come salvarsi il girovita (Italian for How to save your waistline), in 2012 on Amazon Kindle, debuting in the Top Ten.

Her book I mariti delle altre (Italian for Other women's husbands) chronicles both her experience with her father's infidelity from a personal perspective and the culture of adultery in Italy in general.

Her first novel, Qualunque cosa significhi amore ("Whatever love means", the notorious Charles Windsor's quote about his marriage to Diana Spencer), was published on May 27, 2015.

Bibliography 
 Come salvarsi il girovita (2012)
 I mariti delle altre (2014)
 La repubblica dei cuochi (2015)
 Qualunque cosa significhi amore (2015)
 L'era della suscettibilità (2021)
 L'economia del sé: Breve storia dei nuovi esibizionismi (2022)

References

External links

Italian journalists
1972 births
Italian women journalists
Italian columnists
Italian women writers
Italian writers
Italian women columnists
Living people